Édouard Fabre (August 21, 1885 – July 1, 1939) was a Canadian marathon runner.

Born in Sainte-Geneviève, Quebec, he won the Boston Marathon in 1915, with a time of 2:56:41.8. In 1914, he had come in second in the Boston Marathon to fellow Canadian James Duffy. In 1964, he was inducted into Canada's Sports Hall of Fame.

Parc Édouard-Fabre in Montreal is named in his honour.

See also

 List of winners of the Boston Marathon

References

External links
 
 
 

1885 births
1939 deaths
Canadian male long-distance runners
Athletes from Montreal
Olympic track and field athletes of Canada
Athletes (track and field) at the 1912 Summer Olympics
People from L'Île-Bizard–Sainte-Geneviève
French Quebecers
Boston Marathon male winners